Lake Lanao (Maranao: Ranao or Ranaw) is a large ancient lake in the province of Lanao del Sur, Philippines. Scholars have been pushing for the lake's inclusion in the UNESCO World Heritage List.

History
In 1965, Lake Lanao was renamed to Lake Sultan Alonto by Republic Act No. 4260, which was later repealed by Republic Act No. 6434 in 1972.

Lake Lanao was proclaimed as a watershed reservation in 1992 by President Corazon Aquino through Presidential Proclamation No. 971 to ensure protection of forest cover and water yield for hydropower, irrigation and domestic use.

Section 22 of Article XIII of the Bangsamoro Organic Law does not include this lake as being under the jurisdiction of the Bangsamoro Autonomous Region in Muslim Mindanao; certain sectors of the Maranao people had sought the inclusion of this lake into the Bangsamoro Organic Law.

Physical characteristics
The lake was formed by the tectonic-volcanic damming of a basin between two mountain ranges and the collapse of a large volcano. The basin is shallowest towards the north and gets progressively deeper towards the south.

The lake is fed by four rivers. Its only outlet is the Agus River, which flows northwest into Iligan Bay via two channels, one over the Maria Cristina Falls and the other over the Tinago Falls. A hydroelectric plant installed on the Lanao Lake and Agus River system generates 70% of the electricity used by the people of Mindanao.

The lake is a home of myths and legends of the Meranaw tribe. The name Meranaw was derived from the name of the lake and it means "the people living around the lake".

Biodiversity
The lake is (or was) home to 17 endemic species of cyprinid fish in the genus Barbodes (most were formerly in Puntius), as well as the near-endemic B. tumba. It also supports a large number of waterfowl. An investigations in 1992 only managed to locate three of the endemic/near-endemic fish species, and only two (the endemic B. lindog and the near-endemic B. tumba) were located in 2008. In 2020, 15 of the endemics were regarded as extinct, while B. lindog and B. sirang were regarded as possibly extinct. It is believed that overfishing, pollution and competition from introduced species caused the extinctions. The freshwater crab Sundathelphusa wolterecki (Parathelphusidae) is endemic to the lake region. In October 2006, a study from the Mindanao State University discovered massive algae contamination in Lake Lanao. Initially, poor sewage and agricultural waste management were seen as the culprit to the contamination. However, the Department of Agriculture and the Bureau of Fisheries and Aquatic Resources stated that soil erosion from indiscriminate logging and extensive land use and farming are the problems that caused the algae contamination.

The 18 endemic/near-endemic cyprinid species of Lake Lanao (B. binotatus also occurs, but it is a widespread species):
Barbodes amarus Herre  (pait; dipura)
Barbodes baoulan Herre ** (baolan)  
Barbodes clemensi Herre  (bagangan)
Barbodes disa Herre ** (Diza) 
Barbodes flavifuscus Herre  (tumba) 
Barbodes herrei (Fowler, 1934)
Barbodes katolo Herre  (katolo) 
Barbodes lanaoensis Herre  (kundur) 
Barbodes lindog Herre ** (lindog) 
Barbodes manalak Herre ** (manalak)
Barbodes pachycheilus Herre  (Bongkaong)
Barbodes palaemophagus Herre  (bitungu)
Barbodes palata Herre ** (palata)
Barbodes resimus Herre * (bagangan sa erungan) 
Barbodes sirang Herre  sirang; (Tumaginting) 
Barbodes tras Herre  (tras)
Barbodes truncatulus Herre  (bitungu)
Barbodes tumba Regan (tumba)

Notes:
* — Biggest native species in Lake Lanao
** — Species of high commercial value

In culture
A Maranao myth describes the formation of the lake. Long ago, there was a polity known as Mantapoli centered in Lake Lanao. The people of the polity increased in population due to advancements in many fields. Because of the sudden growth in population and power, the equilibrium between Sebangan (east) and Sedpan (west) was broken. This problem soon came to the attention of archangel Diabarail (for Muslim Maranaos or Gabriel for Christian Maranaos). Afterwards, Diabarail went to heaven and told Allah the news. Sohora, the vice of Allah, advised Diabarail to go to seven regions beneath the earth and seven regions in the sky to summon the angels. Sohora also said that when Allah fully establishes the barahana (solar eclipse), they will remove Mantapoli from its location and transfer it into the center of the world. When the angels were summoned and the barahana made, Mantapoli was soon teleported into the earth's center, leaving a vast hole in its former location. The hole eventually filled with water and turned into a deep blue-colored lake. When Diabarail saw the tides of water, he immediately went to heaven to report to Allah. He told Allah that the waters may drown the people. Hearing this, Allah commanded Diabarail to summon the four winds (Angin-Taupan, Angin-Besar, Angin-Darat, and Angin-Sarsar) to blow the excess waters and establish outlets where these waters will flow to. After three trails, the winds succeeded and the Agus river was established.

A Meranaw is a spoken or language of Maranao people.
Sarimanok
 Sarimanok is a Meranau symbol of Meranaw people.

References

External links
 How the Angels Built Lake Lanao

 
Ancient lakes
Lanao
Landforms of Lanao del Sur